Luis Felipe Laverde Jimenez (born 6 July 1979 in Urrao) is Colombian professional road bicycle racer for , having left the  team. His best results are two stage victories in the Giro d'Italia, in 2006 and 2007.

Palmarès

2001
 Pan American Champion U23
2003
 Stage 4, Settimana Ciclistica Lombarda
2006
 Stage 14, Giro d'Italia
2007
 Stage 6, Giro d'Italia
 Gran Premio Nobili Rubinetterie
2011
 3rd, Giro dell'Appennino
2013
 6th Overall, Vuelta a Colombia
2014
 4th, Pan American Road Race Championships
2015
 3rd Overall, Vuelta a Colombia
1st Stage 12
2016
 6th Overall, Vuelta a Colombia
2017 
 7th Overall, Vuelta a Colombia

Notes

References

External links
 Profile on Ceramica Panaria-Navigare official website
 
 
 
 
 
 
 

1979 births
Living people
Colombian male cyclists
Olympic cyclists of Colombia
Cyclists at the 2004 Summer Olympics
Pan American Games competitors for Colombia
Cyclists at the 1999 Pan American Games
Central American and Caribbean Games medalists in cycling
Central American and Caribbean Games bronze medalists for Colombia
Competitors at the 1998 Central American and Caribbean Games
South American Games medalists in cycling
South American Games silver medalists for Colombia
Competitors at the 2010 South American Games
Colombian Giro d'Italia stage winners
Sportspeople from Antioquia Department
20th-century Colombian people
21st-century Colombian people